Left for Dead is the second studio album by Bostonian pop punk band, Lustra. The album was released on February 28, 2006, through XOFF Records. Including the band's history as "Seventeen", this is the fourth studio album by the band.

The album contains their single "Scotty Doesn't Know", which was the first single to chart, reaching number 53 on the Billboard Pop 100 and 78 on the Billboard Hot 100. The song was featured in the 2004 film, Eurotrip.

Tracks

References 

2006 albums
Garage rock revival albums
Lustra (band) albums